A by-election was held in the federal riding of Calgary Heritage in Alberta, Canada on 3 April 2017 following the resignation of Conservative MP and former Prime Minister of Canada Stephen Harper. The safe seat was held by the Conservative candidate Bob Benzen on an increased majority.

The by-election was scheduled to coincide with four others across the country, and was one of two to be held in the city of Calgary; Calgary Midnapore.

Background

Constituency 
Calgary Heritage covers the southwestern corner of Calgary.The electoral district was created for the 2015 federal election and has had Harper as its only MP; however, it is largely composed of the former riding of Calgary Southwest which was held by conservative parties throughout its existence.

Campaign 
The riding of Calgary Heritage became vacant when former Prime Minister of Canada Stephen Harper resigned his seat on August 26, 2016, to return to private life, including accepting directorships on corporate boards and establishing a consultancy firm.

The by-election was announced on February 22, 2017. The Speaker's warrant regarding the vacancy was received on August 29, 2016. The last day a by-election could have been announced was February 25, 2017, with an election held at least 36 days after being announced.

Candidates 
Bob Benzen, a small business owner and member of the Calgary Heritage Conservative Association defeated Rick Billington, a lawyer and the former president of the Calgary Heritage Conservative Association, and city prosecutor Paul Frank for the Conservative nomination, which was decided on October 23. Former Calgary Centre MP Joan Crockatt, party insider Alan Hallman, former Medicine Hat MP Monte Solberg, and Dan Williams, a former staffer to Calgary Midnapore MP Jason Kenney, all declined to run for the nomination despite speculation to the contrary. Ric McIver, leader of the Progressive Conservative Association of Alberta and MLA for Calgary-Hays, stated that he would not run.

Rumoured candidates for the Liberal nomination included physician Brendan Miles, the 2015 candidate in this riding, Chima Nkemdirim, the chief of staff to Calgary Mayor Naheed Nenshi, and former Conservative MP Lee Richardson. On February 8, 2017, the Liberal nomination was won by physician Scott Forsyth, defeating Steven Turner and Kanwar Gill.

Khalis Ahmed won the uncontested NDP nomination.

Taryn Knorren defeated Brennan Wauters for the Green Party of Canada nomination.

The Libertarian candidate was Darcy Gerow.

Businesswoman and former Dragons' Den star Arlene Dickinson was considered a potential candidate until she declined interest on January 22. Dickinson stated she had supported parts of both Conservative and Liberal platforms in the past, but considers herself non-partisan.

Results

2015 results

References 

2017 elections in Canada
2017 in Alberta
Federal by-elections in Alberta
Politics of Calgary
April 2017 events in Canada
Stephen Harper